Trudy Anne Kilkolly (born 4 October 1965 in Wanganui) is a former field hockey player from New Zealand, who finished in eighth position with the National Women's Field Hockey Team, nicknamed The Black Sticks, at the 1992 Summer Olympics in Barcelona.

See now works in Local Government, in New Zealand.

References

External links
 

New Zealand female field hockey players
Olympic field hockey players of New Zealand
Field hockey players at the 1992 Summer Olympics
1965 births
Living people